Lotfi Akalay (1943-2019), born in Tangier, was a Moroccan journalist, writer and businessman.

Early life
He was well-known for his articles in Al Bayane, La Vie Économique, Charlie Hebdo and Jeune Afrique. He also presented a radio-program on jazz and classical music (Radio Mediterranee Internationale).

Career
In 1996 he published his first novel Les nuits d´Azed and in 1998, Ibn Battouta, Pince des Voyageurs.

Akalay studied economy and political sciences in Paris, worked with Royal Air Maroc and ran a travel agency in Tangier. In 1990 he started to write for journals and magazines. In 2006 he published a collection of his chronicles in one book Les Nouvelles de Tanger.

Death
He died on 18 December 2019.

References

1943 births
2019 deaths
20th-century Moroccan businesspeople
Moroccan novelists
Moroccan male writers
Male novelists
People from Tangier